Peter Fabbri Langman (born February 20, 1960) is an American counseling psychologist and author. He is a known expert on school shooters.

Professional career 
Langman received his B.A. in psychology from Clark University, his M.A. in counseling psychology from Lesley College, and his Ph.D. in counseling psychology from Lehigh University.

In 2009, he published his research on ten school shooters based on the analysis of the Columbine High School massacre, the Virginia Tech shooting, the Red Lake shootings, the Thurston High School shooting, the Parker Middle School dance shooting, the Westside Middle School shootings, the Heath High School shooting and the Bethel Regional High School shooting. Langman's book Why Kids Kill: Inside the Minds of School Shooters has been translated into German, Finnish, and Dutch. When the book had been found in Munich shooter's home as well as in the Arapahoe High School shooter's home, a discourse began regarding whether the shooters had used the book as inspiration or for looking for a role model, someone to emulate.

In 2015, he continued his research by extending the number of analysed school shooters from ten to 48 and published the book School Shooters: Understanding High School, College, and Adult Perpetrators. On the website Psychology Today, Langman writes a blog, "Keeping Kids Safe".

Books 
 Peter Langman: Why Kids Kill: Inside the Minds of School Shooters. Palgrave Macmillan, New York 2009. 
 Peter Langman: School Shooters: Understanding High School, College, and Adult Perpetrators. Rowman & Littlefield Lanham 2015 
 Peter Langman: Jewish Issues in Multiculturalism: A Handbook for Educators and Clinicians. Jason Aronson 1999 
 Peter Langman: The Last Days of John Keats and Other Poems. 2009 
 Peter Langman: A qualitative investigation of multicultural education. (Dissertation) 2000

References

1960 births
Living people
21st-century American psychologists
American psychology writers
Clark University alumni
Lesley University alumni
Lehigh University alumni
Writers from Allentown, Pennsylvania
20th-century American psychologists